is the first best album of Chara, which was released on October 10, 1995. It features material from her first four studio albums, Sweet, Soul Kiss, Violet Blue and Happy Toy; as well as some new material. It debuted at #5 on the Japanese Oricon album charts, and charted in the top 200 for 13 weeks. It eventually sold 190,000 copies.

Two singles were released prior to the album. Tiny Tiny Tiny, an original single, was released in July, and reached #62 on the Oricon singles charts. A few weeks before the album, a remix EP called The Singles Re-Mixed was released.

The album does not feature all of Chara's singles released up until this point. No Toy (Re-Mix),  and Gifted Child are left out entirely. From , only Charlotte no Okurimono is featured, however it is featured as the remixed version from The Singles Re-Mixed.

The album appears to be named because of her songs Baby Baby (featured on Happy Toy) and Soul Kiss xxx, however neither songs are on this collection. Soul Kiss xxx is the only album title track not present.

Track listing

Singles

Japan Sales Rankings

References 
 	

Chara (singer) compilation albums
1995 greatest hits albums